The Teutoburg Forest is a range of low, forested hills in the German states of Lower Saxony and North Rhine-Westphalia. Until the 17th century, the official name of the hill ridge was Osning. It was first renamed the Teutoburg Forest in 1616 in commemoration of the Battle of the Teutoburg Forest in 9 AD, which most likely took place at Kalkriese instead.

Geography
The Teutoburg Forest is a peripheral section in the north of the German Central Uplands, and forms a long narrow range of hills (comprising three ridges) extending from the eastern surroundings of Paderborn in the south to the western surroundings of Osnabrück in the northwest. South of the city centre of Bielefeld, a gap called the Bielefeld Pass bisects the range into the Northern Teutoburg Forest (two thirds) and Southern Teutoburg Forest (one third). In addition, the northeastern and southwestern ridges are cut by the exits of the longitudinal valleys between the ridges.

The geologically oldest ridge is the northeastern one, which consists of limestone of the Triassic.

Most of the ridges and part of the valley are covered by deciduous forest. Parts of the valley areas are used for agriculture, especially production of cereals.

The highest elevation in the Southern Teutoburg Forest is the Velmerstot south of Horn-Bad Meinberg. In the Northern Teutoburg Forest the highest elevation is the Dörenberg north of Bad Iburg.

The river Ems has its source at the western base of the southernmost portion of the Teutoburg Forest.

The drainage towards the Weser is effected by the Werre river. The northwestern half of the range is drained to the river Ems on both sides.

The neighbouring landscapes are the Westphalian Lowland in the west, Hase valley in the north, the hilly Ravensberg Basin in the northeast, Lippe Uplands in the east, and Egge Range in the south.

Except for a short area south of Osnabrück, which belongs to the Bundesland of Lower Saxony, the whole forest is part of North Rhine-Westphalia.

A long-distance hiking trail called Hermannsweg runs for  along the length of the Teutoberg Forest, from Rheine in Münsterland to Leopoldstal near Horn-Bad Meinberg.

History
The Battle of Teutoburg Forest in 9 AD occurred in or near this region, though the exact location is disputed. The Roman historian Cornelius Tacitus identified the location of the battle as saltus Teutoburgiensis (saltus meaning a forest valley in Latin). Recent excavations suggest that at least the final stages of the battle took place further northwest, at Kalkriese, north of Osnabrück.

 the Teutoburg Forest comprises two separate nature parks:

 TERRA.vita Nature Park, northwest part between Bielefeld and Osnabrück
 Teutoburg Forest / Egge Hills Nature Park between Bielefeld and river Diemel

Hills

Hermann's Memorial and the renaming of the Osning 

Arminius (also known as Hermann the Cherusker), leader of the Germanic tribes during the battle, became something of a legend for his overwhelming victory over the Romans. During the period of national renaissance in the wake of the Napoleonic wars, German people saw him as an early protagonist of German resistance to foreign rule and a symbol of national unity.

A monumental statue of Arminius commemorating the battle, known as the Hermannsdenkmal (the "Hermann monument"), was erected on the hill of Grotenburg near Detmold, close to the site where the most popular theory of the time placed the battle. Emperor William I, the first Kaiser of the unified German Empire, dedicated the monument in 1875. In order to create a national landscape the Osning Hills were given the name "Teutoburg Forest", see also Teutonic. The first to use that name had been historian and geographer Philipp Clüver in 1616, later it became more common when Ferdinand of Fürstenberg used it in his history and had it printed on maps.
However, the old name survived among the local population and the part of the ridge around the Ebberg near Bielefeld is still known as the Osning today.

The composer Johannes Brahms liked to take walks in this forest during his stay in Detmold.

Websites 
 Arminius / Varus. The Battle of the Teutoburg Forest - Internet-Portal "Westfälische Geschichte", LWL-Institut für westfälische Regionalgeschichte, Münster
 Teutoburg Forest as a holiday destination - site of regional tourism board

References

External links

 
Forests and woodlands of Germany
Forests and woodlands of Lower Saxony
Mountains and hills of North Rhine-Westphalia